Perumalmalai is a hillock and neighborhood in Erode. It is located in the North-Western side of Erode City Municipal Corporation

Location
The hillock located about 10 km from Central Bus Terminus, Erode and 4 km away from Bhavani along National Highway 544H. Located amidst the River Cauvery and Kalingarayan Canal. There is a PUMS school in Perumalmalai.

The hillock is also called as Mangalagiri  and the temple atop the temple is a Vishnu temple called as Mangalagiri Perumal Temple. And the Cauvery River Ghat in the foothills is known as Mangalathurai.

References

Neighbourhoods in Erode